Utai may refer to

 Wutai Shan, a sacred mountain in northern China,
 Utai (Star Wars), a fictional alien species in the Star Wars franchise.